Aerospace Medicine and Human Performance (AMHP) is a peer-reviewed scientific journal in the field of aviation and aerospace medicine. It was founded as the Journal of Aviation Medicine in 1930 by Louis H. Bauer, M.D., and is published monthly by the Aerospace Medical Association.

Aviation, Space, and Environmental Medicine is the most used and cited journal in its field, and is distributed to more than 80 nations.

The journal was first published, under the title Journal of Aviation Medicine in 1930. In 1959 the title changed to Aerospace Medicine, was renamed Aviation, Space, and Environmental Medicine in 1975, and acquired its current name in 2015. It is often referred to as "the blue journal" by its subscribers.

Digital content from recent (since 2003) journal issues is available online via IngentaConnect. This content is free-of-charge to AsMA members and available for purchase to non-members. A DVD archive is available for purchase from AsMA. This DVD contains all articles published prior to 2003, including the predecessor titles back to 1930.

See also 
 List of medical journals

External links

References

Occupational safety and health journals
Publications established in 1930
Monthly journals
English-language journals